Lacapelle-Marival (Languedocien: La Capèla de Marival) is a commune in the Lot department in south-western France.

See also
Communes of the Lot department

References

Lacapellemarival